Miss Kathmandu is a beauty pageant that selects the representative for the Kathmandu Valley in the Miss Nepal pageant. The current titleholder is Prinsha Shrestha, who is the reigning Miss Nepal Earth 2014.

History
Kathmandu Jaycess started the Miss Kathmandu pageant alongside Miss Nepal contest which was run by Girendra Man Rajbansi but after a year in 1995, he left the regional director position to Gopal Sundarlal Kakshapati who is also the chairman for Miss Nepal contest.

Kathmandu is the most successful city ever to compete at Miss Nepal. It has had ten winners, more than any other regional state. Kathmandu is best known for its three consecutive winners with a consistent top 5 placements. Before Kathmandu has won repetitively from 1998 to 1999 and recently from 2009 to 2010, no other regional city has ever won the Miss Nepal pageant more than twice in a row. Kathmandu also holds the most semi-finalists-5 and top 5 spots-5; and has received the most special awards.

Former Miss Teen Nepal titleholders at Miss Kathmandu
Even though a lot of former Miss Teen Nepal titleholders have participated in Miss Kathmandu pageant, none has won the title so far.
Although former Miss Teen Nepal finalists have manage to win Miss Kathmandu title; Zenisha Moktan (2009) who went on to win Miss Nepal 2009 and the same year Miss Kathmandu 2009 1st runner up Kunchhang Moktan Tamang ended as 2nd runner up.

Prior to former Miss Nepal Teen titleholders and finalists who have competed for Miss Kathmandu but did not win the title are:
Aayusha Karki (2007) - Top 10, 3rd runner-up in Miss Nepal 2009.
Kunchhang Moktan Tamang (2006; Top 5) - 1st runner-up, 2nd runner-up in Miss Nepal 2009.

Winners

1 Age at the time of the Miss Nepal pageant

References

External links
Official Website
Pageant

Beauty pageants in Nepal
Nepalese awards
Miss Nepal regional pageants
Recurring events established in 1994
1994 establishments in Nepal
Culture of Kathmandu